János Bódi (born 10 July 1932) is a Hungarian modern pentathlete. He competed at the 1956 Summer Olympics.

References

1932 births
Living people
Hungarian male modern pentathletes
Olympic modern pentathletes of Hungary
Modern pentathletes at the 1956 Summer Olympics
Sportspeople from Budapest